Los enredos de papá ("The Entanglements of Dad") is a 1939 Mexican film. It stars Sara García.

External links
 

1939 films
1930s Spanish-language films
Mexican black-and-white films
Mexican comedy films
1939 comedy films
1930s Mexican films